The National Parks and Wildlife Service (NPWS) is a directorate of the New South Wales Department of Planning and Environment responsible for managing most of the protected areas in the state of New South Wales, Australia. Despite its name the NPWS is a state agency rather than a national one, with similarly named counterparts fulfilling comparable functions in other states and territories.

History 
The NPWS was established in 1967 when the Fauna Protection Panel and the Parks and Reserves Branch of the NSW Lands Department were amalgamated under Lands Minister Tom Lewis . Lewis also established a charity, the National Parks Foundation, to assist the NPWS in raising funds for conservation. The first Director of the NPWS was Sam P. Weems, formerly of the US National Park Service. Seven years after the founding of the NPWS, various state laws regulating flora and fauna were consolidated together into the National Parks and Wildlife Act 1974, which remains the enabling legislation for the NPWS to this day.

From its establishment in 1967 until 2003 the NPWS was a discrete agency of the NSW Government. Since that time it has been a directorate of various broader state government departments. In September 2003 it joined with the Environment Protection Authority, Resource New South Wales, and the Royal Botanic Gardens and Domain Trust to form the Department of Environment and Conservation. This department, by then renamed as the Department of Environment, Climate Change and Water, was abolished in 2011, and the NPWS was transferred to the Office of Environment & Heritage under the Department of Premier and Cabinet. In 2014 the Office of Environment & Heritage was transferred to the Department of Planning and Environment before also being abolished in 2019. Today, the NPWS continues to be a part of the Department of Planning and Environment cluster, within the Environment and Heritage Group.

Scope of activities 
Nearly 900 protected areas of a variety of types have been declared in New South Wales under the National Parks and Wildlife Act 1974, most of which the NPWS has the responsibility to manage. This is controlled through the preparation of plans of management which determine how the NPWS manages conservation, hazard protection, research, education, and sustainable visitation activities in its parks and reserves. The NPWS also administers fire management strategies for the land it manages in order to limit risks from bushfires, such as by conducting hazard reduction burns in collaboration with other state agencies such as the New South Wales Rural Fire Service.

Organisational structure 
The NPWS is divided into four branches: Business Delivery, Park Operations (Coastal), Park Operations (Inland), and Conservation and Aboriginal Partnerships. It is lead by a Deputy Secretary, who reports to the Coordinator-General of the Environment and Heritage Group, who reports to the Secretary of the Department of Planning and Environment, who in turn reports to the Minister for Environment and Heritage, the minister responsible for the NPWS.

Gallery

See also 
Protected areas of New South Wales
National Parks and Wildlife Act 1974

References

External links 
 Official site

Government agencies of New South Wales
1967 establishments in Australia
Protected area administrators of Australia
Wildfire suppression agencies